Juliette Rose Goglia is an American actress, singer and musician. She is best known for portraying Sierra in the Disney Channel series That's So Raven, Hannah West in the CBS series CSI: Crime Scene Investigation, and Eve Henry on The Michael J. Fox Show.

Early life
Goglia was born in a suburb of Los Angeles, California, the daughter of Susan Stokey, an actress, and Carmine Goglia, a scenic painter of Italian descent. Her maternal grandfather was game show host and producer Mike Stokey. She has one older brother named Dante and one older sister named Emily.

Career
Goglia made her film debut as Colleen O'Brian in the 2004 Hallmark Channel original film The Long Shot, followed by a minor role in the feature film Garfield: The Movie.

Goglia has appeared on several television shows, such as Joanie on Two and a Half Men and as Sierra on That's So Raven for two episodes each. Her longest-running television role to date is as one of the incarnations of God, referred to as "Little Girl God" on CBS's Joan of Arcadia. She was in eight episodes before the series was cancelled in April 2005.

Goglia played a child prodigy suspected of murder on CSI: Crime Scene Investigation and a teen suffering from seizures in the cancelled CBS drama 3 lbs. She also had a recurring role on the Fox drama Vanished, and appeared on Hannah Montana in the episode "Bye Bye Ball" as Angela. She also appeared in the Shake It Up episode "Match It Up" as Savannah, Deuce's (Adam Irigoyen) girlfriend.

In 2013, Goglia played the character Eve Henry on The Michael J. Fox Show. 
She is also a singer-songwriter. She has recorded and written five songs: "Every Time I'm With You", "Into a Dream", "Crystal Ball", "Thought You Were The One", and "Inattention". She has also recorded a cover of the song, "Listen" from Dreamgirls. She took part in Southern California's "Diva's: Simply Singing" in 2004. She was the recipient of "Female Vocalist of the Year" award at the 20th Annual Los Angeles Music Awards in 2010.

In February 2022, Goglia was a contestant on I Can See Your Voice, using the alias of "Hollywood Starlet."

Filmography

References

External links
 

Year of birth missing (living people)
21st-century American actresses
Actresses from Los Angeles
American child actresses
American people of Italian descent
American film actresses
American television actresses
Living people